PT Alumindo Light Metal Industry Tbk, or also known simply as Alumindo, is the largest flat rolled aluminium manufacturer in South East Asia, and a publicly-traded subsidiary of Maspion which was founded in 1978 and started to become a commercial company in 1983. The company is headquartered in Surabaya, East Java. Initially, each year the company was able to produce around 4,800 tons of aluminum sheet which is usually used as the main ingredient in the manufacture of household appliances, transportation equipment, as well as building materials. Alumindo also produces 12 thousand tons of tin sheet which is the main ingredient in the packaging industry.

History 
Alumindo was originally built on 26 June 1978 for procuring raw materials for the Maspion Group company which manufactures kitchen equipment and packaging industries in the Indonesian market. As market demand continues to grow, Alumnindo is able to adding production capacity which has now reached 144 thousand tons of aluminum and 15.6 thousand tons of tin. Alumindo mainly produces air cargo containers, cooking utensils, food wrappers and cigarettes, and bottle caps.

On 11 December 1996, ALMI obtained an effective statement from BAPEPAM-LK (now the Financial Services Authority - OJK) to conduct an initial public offering. These shares were listed on the Surabaya Stock Exchange and Jakarta Stock Exchange (now the Indonesia Stock Exchange) on 2 January 1997.

In 1998, Alumindo received a certificate from ISO 9002 from Lloyd's Register as a company that is recognized as having international standards in the production process. Alumindo also received the same award for the Exporter with Excellent Performance category as an appreciation for the performance of excellent exporters with management that complies with international standards based on The Aluminum Association.

Products 

 Aluminium sheet
 Aluminium circle
 Aluminium embossed and roofing
 Aluminium foil

References

External links 

 Alumindo official English website
 Alumindi official Indonesian website

Aluminium companies of Indonesia
Manufacturing companies established in 1978
Indonesian brands
Indonesian companies established in 1978
1997 initial public offerings
Companies listed on the Indonesia Stock Exchange
Companies based in Surabaya